The 2006 San Francisco Board of Supervisors elections occurred on November 7, 2006. Five of the eleven seats were contested in this election. Four of the five incumbents ran for reelection, while one sought another elected office.

Municipal elections in California are officially non-partisan, though most candidates in San Francisco do receive funding and support from various political parties.

Results

District 2 

District 2 consists of the Marina, Pacific Heights, the Presidio, part of Russian Hill, and Sea Cliff. Incumbent supervisor Michela Alioto-Pier ran for reelection.

District 4 

District 4 consists primarily of the Sunset district. Incumbent supervisor Fiona Ma did not run for reelection.

Ranked-choice vote distribution

District 6 

District 6 consists of Alcatraz Island, Civic Center, Mission Bay, South of Market, the Tenderloin, Treasure Island, and Yerba Buena Island. Incumbent supervisor Chris Daly ran for reelection.

Ranked-choice vote distribution

District 8 

District 8 consists of The Castro, Diamond Heights, Duboce Triangle, Eureka Valley, Glen Park, and Noe Valley. Incumbent supervisor Bevan Dufty ran for reelection.

District 10 

District 10 consists of Bayview-Hunters Point, McLaren Park, part of the Portola, Potrero Hill, and Visitacion Valley. Incumbent supervisor Sophie Maxwell ran for reelection.

References

External links 
San Francisco Department of Elections
Voter Information Pamphlet (PDF)
SF Vote Watch

San Francisco Board of Supervisors
Elections Board of Supervisors
San Francisco Board of Supervisors
Board of Supervisors 2006
San Francisco-related lists
2000s in San Francisco